Exostoma barakensis is a species of sisorid catfish from India.

References

Further reading
Ng, H.H. and M. Kottelat, 2018. A new Glyptosternine catfish from Northern Myanmar (Teleostei: Siluriformes: Sisoridae). Copeia 106(1):63-69.

Catfish of Asia
Fish of India
Taxa named by Waikhom Vishwanath
Taxa named by H. Joyshree
Fish described in 2007
Sisoridae